Ernocornutia basisignata is a species of moth of the family Tortricidae. It is found in Peru.

The wingspan is 15 mm. The ground colour of the forewings is cream, preserved as a large basal blotch, incomplete subterminal interfascia and remnants of subapical interfascia. Other parts of the ground colour are suffused brownish and dark greyish brown. The hindwings are grey cream strigulated (finely streaked) with grey-brown.

Etymology
The species name refers to the forewing markings and is derived from Latin basis (meaning base) and signata (meaning signed).

References

Moths described in 2010
Euliini
Moths of South America
Taxa named by Józef Razowski